The Harbor Oaks Residential District (also known as Harbor Oaks Subdivision) is a U.S. historic district (designated as such on March 15, 1988) located in Clearwater, Florida. The district is bounded by Druid Road, South Fort Harrison Avenue, Lotus Path, and Clearwater Harbor. It contains 81 historic buildings and 6 objects.

Residences
 Donald Roebling Estate

References

External links
 National Register of Historic Places.com: Pinellas County NRHP listings 

Clearwater, Florida
Historic districts on the National Register of Historic Places in Florida
National Register of Historic Places in Pinellas County, Florida
Buildings and structures in Clearwater, Florida
Communities developed by Dean Alvord
Protected areas established in 1988
1988 establishments in Florida